The Columbia Arsenal, also known as the Columbia Military Academy, comprises nine historic buildings in Columbia, Tennessee, United States.

History
The nine buildings of the Columbia Arsenal were built from 1890 to 1891 by the United States federal government.

Architectural significance
The buildings were listed on the National Register of Historic Places in 1977.

References

Government buildings on the National Register of Historic Places in Tennessee
Romanesque Revival architecture in Tennessee
Colonial Revival architecture in Tennessee
Buildings and structures completed in 1891
Buildings and structures in Columbia, Tennessee
National Register of Historic Places in Maury County, Tennessee